Thomas Edward Donovan (born January 13, 1957) is a former American football wide receiver who was on the playing roster for the New Orleans Saints for a season in 1980. He played in the United States Football League for the Philadelphia Stars and Baltimore Stars between 1983 and 1985. 

Donovan played college football at Penn State University. He was a ninth round draft pick (pick #230) in the 1980 NFL draft, selected by the Kansas City Chiefs. The Chiefs traded him to the New Orleans Saints, where he remained on the team roster but never played a game. He was delisted at the end of the 1980 season.

In 1983 he was drafted by the Philadelphia Stars in the USFL’s inaugural season, where the Stars won their division and played in the USFL Championship Game. He caught 37 passes for 559 yards and 6 receiving touchdowns in his USFL career.

References 

Living people
1957 births
Penn State Nittany Lions football players
New Orleans Saints players
Philadelphia/Baltimore Stars players
American football wide receivers